The Binary Application Markup Language is a file format developed by Microsoft that is generated by compiling XAML files.

Generation
An XAML file can be compiled into a Binary Application Markup Language file with the .BAML extension, which may be inserted as a resource into a .NET Framework assembly. At run-time, the framework engine extracts the .BAML file from assembly resources, parses it, and creates a corresponding WPF visual tree or workflow. Having this format, the content is loadable faster during runtime, because the XAML is enriched by tokens, and lexical analysis is completed.

References

Application programming interfaces
Operating system technology